The DP-12 is a bullpup 12-gauge pump action double-barreled shotgun designed by Standard Manufacturing. It has two tube magazines, each of which feeds its own barrel. Each magazine tube can hold up to seven  12-gauge shotshells or six  shotgun shells. 16 (2¾") or 14 (3") in total with indicator windows.

Operation
The DP-12 shotgun is a manually operated, pump action weapon. The first trigger pull fires the right barrel and the second fires the left. The sliding forend is connected to the bolt by dual operating bars. Ammunition is fed from two independent magazine tubes, located below the barrels.

Rounds are loaded into the magazines through a large loading/ejection port, located at the bottom rear of the gun in the stock, behind the pistol grip. Empty shells are ejected down through the same port. The safety is a cross-bolt manual safety button located above the grip. This, coupled with the center loading and ejection, makes the gun fully ambidextrous.

Sighting equipment is not included, but iron sights and/or a red dot sight can be installed using the standard Picatinny rail located above the barrels. A second Picatinny rail at the end of the slide (under the muzzles) can be used for a forward grip or other accessories.

Chokes
The barrels come threaded with a Tru-Choke thread pattern and two flush-mount spreader choke tubes. There are two optional chokes from the manufacturer, the doorbuster tactical choke and stiletto choke.

Colors
There are several different color variants of this shotgun. They include black, flat-dark earth, green, tan, gold and black & gold two-tone.

See also
List of bullpup firearms
List of shotguns
NeoStead 2000
UTAS UTS-15
Kel-Tec KSG

References

External links
 Standard Mfg Co.
 User Manual

Shotguns by manufacturer
Bullpup shotguns
Pump-action shotguns
Double-barreled shotguns of the United States
Shotguns of the United States